Ralph Robinson Pake was an English professional footballer who played as a centre forward.

References

Sportspeople from Tynemouth
Footballers from Tyne and Wear
English footballers
Association football forwards
Percy Main Amateurs F.C. players
Newcastle United F.C. players
Burnley F.C. players
English Football League players
Year of birth missing
Year of death missing